Events from the year 1708 in Canada.

Incumbents
French Monarch: Louis XIV
British and Irish Monarch: Anne

Governors
Governor General of New France: Philippe de Rigaud Vaudreuil
Governor of Acadia: Daniel d'Auger de Subercase
Colonial Governor of Louisiana: Jean-Baptiste Le Moyne de Bienville
Governor of Plaisance: Philippe Pastour de Costebelle

Births
 Christopher Dufrost de La Jemeraye born December 6 of this year. Already in ill health, he died while travelling from Fort Maurepas (Canada) on the Red River to Fort St. Charles on Lake of the Woods. He was buried near the junction of the Red and Roseau rivers (died 1736).

Deaths
 May 6 - François de Laval, 1st Bishop of Quebec (born 1623)

Historical documents
"Canada Survey'd, or the French Dominions upon the Continent of America briefly considered in their situation, strength, trade and number"

Two descriptions of the capture of St. John's, Newfoundland by the French

"This nott more than 3 minutes after ye first musquetts firing" - Fall of Fort William at St. John's to French, Canadian and Indigenous force

References
 

 
Canada
08
1700s in Canada